Gyula Nyári (born 31 March 1965) is a Hungarian sailor. He competed at the 1988 Summer Olympics and the 1992 Summer Olympics.

References

External links
 

1965 births
Living people
Hungarian male sailors (sport)
Olympic sailors of Hungary
Sailors at the 1988 Summer Olympics – 470
Sailors at the 1992 Summer Olympics – 470
Sportspeople from Székesfehérvár